Nicole Holness (born April 13, 1984) is a TV host and R&B singer. Between 2002 and 2005, she was part of the Canadian girl group X-Quisite alongside Melanie Fiona and Nirvana Savoury. In 2006, Holness was chosen as one of the original seven co-hosts of MTV Canada and their flagship series MTV Live. Holness co-hosted MTV Live alongside host Paul Lemieux, Sheena Snively, and Dave Merheje. She has interviewed guests including Akon, Ciara, Ken Tamplin and Lily Allen.

Beginnings
Holness hails from a Guyanese, Indigenous Canadian, Scottish and West Indian background. A Toronto native, Holness is fluent in French and Tagalog and attended Cedarbrae Collegiate Institute. She has a history in ballet and jazz dance, and has been a model in several national print advertisement campaigns.

Part of X-Quisite

In 2002, Holness was part of a Canadian R&B girl group called X-Quisite alongside Melanie Fiona and Nirvana Savoury. Signed to Warner Music (Canada), the group released their self-titled debut studio album X-Quisite in 2003. In 2004, during the Juno Awards, an equivalent of the Grammies, the band was nominated as one of five finalists for "R&B/Soul Recording of the Year" for the album X-Quisite. The group had a number of singles from the album, notably "Bad Girl" and "No Regrets" The group disbanded in 2005.

Solo career
On March 1, 2011, Holness released her debut album Unreleased. The album was preceded by her debut single, "Epic", which was released May 5, 2009. A second single "Pop Yo Bottles" was later released on June 29, 2010.

Discography

Albums
in X-Quisite
2002: X-Quisite (for details and track list, see X-Quisite)
Solo
2011: Unreleased

Singles
in X-Qusite
"Bad Girl" (2004) 
"No Regrets"
Solo
2009: "Epic"
2010: "Pop Yo Bottles"

See also
MTV Live (Canada)

References

Sources 
http://www.openingday.com/ X-Quisite's label
http://www.canadianmusicnetwork.com/archivestories/111NEW%20ARCHIVE%20FOLDER/April%20Archive/Apr6openingday.html
http://www.muchmusic.com/music/artists/index.asp?artist=312
http://www.treymills.com/treymills.swf

http://www.myspace.com/officialxquisite
http://mtvnicole.mtvblogs.ca/default.asp?item=166025

External links
Nicole Holness

1984 births
Living people
Canadian contemporary R&B singers
Canadian television hosts
Black Canadian broadcasters
21st-century Black Canadian women singers
Musicians from Toronto
Canadian people of Guyanese descent
Canadian people of Scottish descent
Canadian women television hosts